Gordon L. Wren (January 5, 1919 – November 25, 1999) was an American ski jumper who competed in the 1940s. He finished fifth in the individual large hill event at the 1948 Winter Olympics in St. Moritz.

Wren was born in Steamboat Springs, Colorado. He was inducted into the Colorado Sports Hall of Fame in 1972. Wren died in Steamboat Springs of cancer at age 80.

References

External links 
 

1919 births
1999 deaths
American male ski jumpers
American male cross-country skiers
American male Nordic combined skiers
Olympic ski jumpers of the United States
Olympic cross-country skiers of the United States
Olympic Nordic combined skiers of the United States
Ski jumpers at the 1948 Winter Olympics
Cross-country skiers at the 1948 Winter Olympics
Nordic combined skiers at the 1948 Winter Olympics
People from Steamboat Springs, Colorado
Deaths from cancer in Colorado